Arunachal Pradesh is land of peanuts in the foothills of the Himalayas in northeast India. River systems in the region, including those from the higher Himalayas and Patkoi and Arakan Ranges, eventually drain into the Brahmaputra River.

Arunachal shares international borders with Bhutan, Tibet (China) and Burma (Myanmar). Internally, Arunachal borders the states of Assam and Nagaland. Arunachal is called the "orchid state of India" and "dawn-lit mountain/Land of Dawn/Land of Dawn-Lit Mountains".

Area and borders 
Arunachal Pradesh is located in northeast India, bordering Bhutan, Tibet (China) and Myanmar internationally.

Water covers 2% of the area. It is the 14th largest among the states and union territories of India by area.

Physical geography

Topography and relief 

Relief range varies between plains that are a few hundred meters in height and mountains above . The elevation of the towns of Naharlagun, Pasighat and Tezu in the south are 290 m, 155 m and 210 m respectively, while Kangto, Nyegi Kangsang and the Gorichen group of mountains are some of the highest peaks in this region of the Himalayas. The southern borders of Arunachal Pradesh are encompassed by the Shivalik ranges which merge into plains. The hills and mountains have associated features such as valleys and intermontane plateaus, that is plateaus between mountains.

Parts of the Lohit district, Changlang district and Tirap district are covered by the Patkai hills. The hills extend towards Nagaland, and form a natural boundary between India and Burma.

Namcha Barwa Himal range extends into India up to Siyom River.

Major hills found in this region include:
 Aka Hills
 Daphla Hills
 Miri Hills
 Abor Hills
 Mishmi Hills
 Patkai Hills

Drainage and river systems 
Out of this, 86% of wetlands are rivers. Lohit district and Dibang Valley district have the highest number of wetlands in the state. 

The major river systems are (from west to east clockwise):

 Kameng
 Subansiri
 Siang
 Dibang
 Lohit

All of these are fed by snow from the Himalayas and numerous rivers and rivulets and eventually flow into Siang/Brahmaputra. Abrasion by the rivers which flow through the mountains has created a broad valley, which is a major feature of the geography of the state.

Other rivers include Tawang Chu, Dikrong, Ranga, Kamala/Kamla, Kamplang, Siyum, Dihing/ Noadihing and Tirap.

Biodiversity

Eco-regions and forest types 
Arunachal consists of a number of eco-regions. At the lowest elevations, at Arunachal Pradesh's border with Assam, are the Brahmaputra Valley semi-evergreen forests. Much of the state, including the Himalayan foothills and the Patkai hills, are home to Eastern Himalayan broadleaf forests. Towards the northern border with Tibet, with increasing elevation, come a mixture of Eastern and Northeastern Himalayan subalpine conifer forests followed by Eastern Himalayan alpine shrub and meadows.

Climatically, the forests can be categorised as tropical and sub-tropical forests, temperate forest, pine forests and subalpine forest, alpine and secondary forests. At the lowest elevations, densely forested areas are seen with the trees ranging from semi-evergreen to broadleaf and semi-alpine forests. Alpine shrubs and meadows follow, ultimately leading to ice-clad peaks.

The Forest Research Institute of India's India State of Forest Report 2019 lists area under different forest types in the state. The major forest types as a percentage of the forest cover area are:

 East Himalayan Sub-Tropical Wet Hill Forest = 24.35%
 East Himalayan Wet Temperate Forest = 22.92%
 East Himalayan Sub-Alpine Birch/Fir Forest = 13.46%
 Alpine Pastures = 6.73%
 Sub-Himalayan Light Alluvial Semi-Evergreen Forest = 6.60%
 Others = Remaining

Forest cover varies from 54% in Tawang district to 92% in Papum Pare district. There are 110 species of trees.

Protected areas include the Dihang-Dibang Biosphere Reserve, Namdapha National Park, Mouling National Park, and 11 wildlife sanctuaries and reserves including elephant reserves, tiger reserves and an orchid sanctuary, covering about 12% of the geographical area of the state.

Flora and fauna 
Flora and fauna in the state includes over 4000 species of flowering plants, 600 bird species, 200 fish species, 42 amphibian species, 85 terrestrial mammals and a wide number of insects, butterflies and reptiles. Orchids, fern, bamboo, cane, rhododendrons, oak, hedychiums, and various medicinal plants form a diverse range of the state's green cover. Among the crops grown here are rice, maize, millet, wheat, pulses, sugarcane, ginger, and oilseeds. Arunachal is also ideal for horticulture and fruit orchards. Its major industries are rice mills, fruit preservation and processing units, and handloom handicrafts  Apart from them, the forests of Arunachal are also home to a large number of people belonging to the different tribes. These tribal people, aloof from urbanization, dwell in these forests where the various forest-based products form a part of their livelihood.

Climatic conditions 

As per the Köppen–Geiger climate classification system, the most prevalent climate types in the state are humid subtropical climate and monsoon-influenced humid subtropical climate. Other climates include subtropical highland climate, monsoon-influenced warm-summer humid continental climate and monsoon-influenced subarctic climate.

The regions in the lower belts of the state experience hot and humid climates, with a maximum temperature in the foothills reaching up to 40 °C (during the summer). The average temperature in this region in winter ranges from 15° to 21 °C while that during the monsoon season remains between 22° and 30 °C.

Arunachal Pradesh experiences heavy rainfall during May to September. The average rainfall recorded in Arunachal Pradesh is 300 centimeters, varying between 80 centimeters and 450 centimeters.

Human geography

Demographics

Administrative divisions

See also 
 Dihang-Dibang Biosphere Reserve

References 
Notes

References

Bibliography 
Books

Government